Club Deportivo Familia Ticona, known as Deportivo FATIC, is a football club from El Alto.

History
Club Familia Ticona was founded on 25 March 2000, and played mainly in local tournaments. In 2015, the club's owners acquired the license of Fraternidad Tigres (founded in 1967), and merged both clubs into Fraternidad Tigres FATIC. In 2016, the club changed name to Club Deportivo FATIC.

References

Association football clubs established in 2000
Football clubs in Bolivia
2015 establishments in Bolivia